Issah Mmari Wangui (May 20, 1981 – March 16, 2003), better known by his stage name E-Sir, was a Kenyan hip hop artist. He was the elder brother to fellow Kenyan rapper Habib. He was famous for his deft lyrical ability and command of the Swahili language. The phenomenal popularity of his music disproved the myth that Kenyan music could never compete with imported pop. Even long after his death, he is still widely regarded as one of the best rappers to have emerged on the Kenyan hip hop scene.
In 2017, he got nominated for the Mdundo Awards for Most Downloaded Hip-Hop Artist in 2017.
At the age of only 21, after only a  brief but most iconic presence in Kenyan music, he died in a car accident in 2003. Boomba Train was his last hit song.

See also
List of Kenyan rappers

References

External links 
 
 Wakilisha.com
 Trueblaq

Kenyan musicians
Kenyan rappers
1981 births
2003 deaths
Kisima Music Award winners
Road incident deaths in Kenya